Bluefields is the capital of the South Caribbean Autonomous Region in Nicaragua. It was also the capital of the former Kingdom of Mosquitia, and later the Zelaya Department, which was divided into North and South Caribbean Coast Autonomous Regions. It is located on Bluefields Bay at the mouth of the Bluefields River in the municipality of the same name.

It was named after Abraham Blauvelt, a Dutch-Jewish pirate, privateer, and explorer of Central America and the western Caribbean. It has a population of 55,575 (2021 estimate) and its inhabitants are mostly Afro-descendant Creoles, Miskitu, Mestizo, as well as smaller communities of Garinagu, Chinese, Mayangna, and Rama. Bluefields is the chief Caribbean port, from which hardwood, seafood, shrimp and lobster are exported. Bluefields was a rendezvous for European buccaneers in the 16th and 17th century and became capital of the English protectorate of the Kingdom of Mosquitia in 1678.

During United States interventions (1912–15, 1926–33) in Nicaragua, US Marines were stationed there. In 1984, the United States mined the harbor (along with those of Corinto and Puerto Sandino) as part of the Nicaraguan Revolution. Bluefields was destroyed by Hurricane Joan in 1988 but was rebuilt.

History

The origin of the city of Bluefields is connected with the presence of European pirates on the Nicaraguan Caribbean coast, subjects of powers at the time hostile to Spain.  These pirates used the Escondido River to rest, to repair damages and to be provisioned. By then, the territory of the present municipality was populated by the native towns of Kukra and Branch.

In 1602, one of these soldiers of fortune chose the bay of Bluefields as his center of operations due to its tactical advantages, a Dutchman named Abraham Blauvelt, and from the phonetic sounding of his surname originates the name of the municipality.

Black Africans first appeared in the Caribbean coast in 1641, when a Portuguese ship that was transporting slaves wrecked in the Miskito Cays. From the original settlement the bay began to be populated; the English subjects first started emigrating to the region in 1633 and from 1666 they were already organized into colonies, and by 1705 there were authorities established. In 1730 the Kingdom of Moskitia came to depend on the British administration in Jamaica. For this, an alliance with the Miskito people was decisive, and the British supplied them with armaments which the Miskito used in conflicts with the other ethnic groups of the Caribbean coast—the Afro-descendant Creoles and the indigenous Mayangnas, Ulwas, and Ramas.

In 1740, the Miskitos yielded to British sovereignty over the territory, and in 1744 a transfer of White colonists was organized from Jamaica to the Kingdom of Moskitia; they brought along with them black slaves. French colonists were also installed. The area was a British protectorate until 1796, when Britain, with an offer from the Spanish Monarch to extend the territory in the Yucatán Peninsula for the cutting of logwood for the British settlers, decided to remove all English settlers from the Kingdom of Moskitia; the British subjects also abandoned the islands, but the Spaniards did not take firm positions in them.

With the independence of the Viceroyalty of New Granada, the Kingdom of Moskitia became de jure part of Gran Colombia until its dissolution in 1831. Thereafter it became part of the Republic of New Granada, now Colombia, until, through the Esguerra-Bárcenas Treaty, the Colombian state formally ceded the territory to Nicaragua.

The Moravian Church was installed in 1847, and in 1860 through the Harrison-Altamirano Treaty, mostly known as the Treaty of Managua, the Miskito Reserve was created from the territory of the Kingdom of Moskitia, by an agreement between the British and Nicaragua government. The city of Bluefields was declared capital of that Reserve.

The “Europeanization” of the natives was completed by the 1880s, when British and Americans expanded the production of bananas and wood, creating an enclave economy; by the 1880 Bluefields was already a city of cosmopolitan character, with an intense commercial activity.

Economic growth also brought a marked process of social differentiation, by which the races and ethnic groups were distributed spatially and in terms of work: the white population represented the interests of the foreign businesses; those of mixed race worked as artisans and in working-class occupations; the darker-skinned Creoles had their niche in physical work, and the native population were employed as servants and for other smaller works.  In 1894, the government of Nicaragua incorporated the Miskito Reserve into the national territory, extinguishing the Miskito monarchy, and on October 11, 1903, Bluefields was proclaimed capital of the Department of Zelaya.

In recent years, however, due to US Coast Guard patrols attempting to intercept Colombian drug smugglers, cocaine (often referred to locally as "white lobster") has become an important part of the local economy. When threatened with potential boarding by US Coast Guard ships, cocaine smugglers try to dispose of their illegal cargo by throwing it overboard, simultaneously lightening their load for a faster escape and eliminating the evidence in case of capture. A percentage of the cocaine bales used to be carried by ocean currents into the lagoon around Bluefields. Residents may find the bales washed up on the beach or seek them by boat in the lagoon or at sea. In recent years this is not that common any more due to stricter legislation.

Bluefields remains a deeply impoverished city with extremely high rates of unemployment.

Climate 
According to Köppen climate classification, Bluefields features a trade-wind tropical rainforest climate (Köppen Af). There is a drier period from February to April, but the trade winds ensure that unlike the Pacific coast of Nicaragua, rain still falls frequently during this period. For the rest of the year when tropical low pressure dominates rainfall is extremely heavy, helped by the coast being shaped in such a manner as to intercept winds from the south as prevail during the northern summer.

Districts
The city is located beside the eponymous bay; consisting of 17 neighborhoods including the port of El Bluff, located on a peninsula of the same name. Due to gradual erosion, the peninsula is becoming a true island that closes the Bay of Bluefields on the east side. El Bluff has an extension of 1.29 km² and it is about 8 km from Bluefields.

Bluefields has several municipal headquarters and rural communities including:

Urban Level:
Santa Rosa,
Central,
San Mateo,
Pointeen,
Fátima,
Tres Cruces,
Ricardo Morales,
Old Bank,
San Pedro,
Teodoro Martínez,
19 de Julio,
Pancasán,
Punta Fría,
New York,
Beholden,
Canal,
Loma Fresca.

Rural Level:
Cuenca Río Escondido,
Cuenca Río Maíz,
San Nicolás,
La Fonseca,
Rama Cay,
San Luís,
Caño Frijol,
Torsuani,
Long Beach,
Dalzuno,
Cuenca Río Indio,
Río Maíz,
Guana Creek,
Nueva Chontales,
Neysi Ríos,
La Palma,
Sub-Cuenca Mahagony,
Krisinbila,
Sub-Cuenca Caño Negro,
Río Kama,
El Bluff,
Las Mercedes,
Monkey Point,
El Corozo,
Cuenca Punta Gorda,
Caño Dalzuno,
Haulover,
Villa Hermosa,
San Ramón,
Río Cama (El Cilicio),
San Brown,
La Virgen,
San Mariano,
La Pichinga,
Musulaine,
Caño Blanco,
Aurora (San Francisco),
Kukra River (Delirio),
Barra Punta Gorda,
Kukra River.

Education
There are currently two universities in Bluefields. One is the Bluefields campus of the University of the Autonomous Regions of the Nicaraguan Caribbean Coast, and the other is the Bluefields Indian and Caribbean University (BICU).

Transportation and infrastructure
Until recently, there was no road access to Bluefields from the west coast of Nicaragua. There is now a highway from Nueva Guinea with regular bus service. The road was completed in May 2019, and was financed with loans from the Inter-American Development Bank and the World Bank. The road was formally declared open by President Daniel Ortega.

Visitors usually either fly in to Bluefields Airport or take a bus from Managua and other cities or take a Panga down the Rio Escondido from the city of El Rama, which itself is accessible from Managua by bus. In the town, taxis are readily available at a fixed price of 14 cordobas per person (2020) and work on a shared basis. The municipal wharf is the home of commercial boat traffic to Corn Island, LaBarra and many other locations which are only accessible by boat. Car ownership is very limited in Bluefields.

The municipal government does not provide all necessary services, so additional services related to water, energy, and sanitation are provided by non-governmental organization blueEnergy.

Popular culture
W. Douglas Burden describes the city in his Look to the Wilderness.

References

External links

Paradise Zone Bluefields Evolution

Municipalities of the South Caribbean Coast Autonomous Region
Populated places established in 1602
1602 establishments in North America
Port cities in the Caribbean